Bury Hill is the site of a former Iron Age hillfort about  southwest of the centre of Andover, Hampshire. There are evident two stages to the construction of the fort, the first is a low single rampart and ditch, to the north and west of the second, stronger double rampart and ditch earthworks, part of which overlies the earlier work. The banks and the ditch are apparently in good condition, although fairly heavily wooded. A footpath encircles the hill fort on the inner rampart, accessible from the northeast and southwest. The centre is left to grass and very secluded, but is not accessible to the general public. The site was used well into the Roman era and was used as a camp by King Canute in 1016, when he fought Edmund Ironside in the Battle of Andover.

Location
The site is south of the Pillhill Brook and Anna Valley, west of the village of Upper Clatford and west of the River Anton. To the south is open farmland.

References



Iron Age sites in England
Buildings and structures in Hampshire
Hill forts in Hampshire
Archaeological sites in Hampshire